A box-bed (also known as a closed bed, close bed, or enclosed bed; less commonly, shut-bed) is a bed enclosed in furniture that looks like a cupboard, half-opened or not. The form originates in western European late medieval furniture.

The box-bed is closed on all sides by panels of wood. One enters it by removing curtains, opening a door hinge or sliding doors on one or two slides.
The bed is placed on short legs to prevent moisture due to a dirt floor.

In front of the box-bed was often a large oaken chest, with the same length as the bed. This was always the 'seat of honour,' and served also as a step for climbing into the bed. It was also used to store clothing, underwear and bedding the rest of the time.

The closed-bed in Brittany 

In Brittany, the closed-bed (French: lit-clos) (Breton: gwele-kloz) is a traditional furnishing. In homes with usually only one room, the box-bed allowed some privacy and helped keep people warm during winter. Similar enclosed bed furniture was once also found in western Britain; Devon, Cornwall, Wales particularly in Gower.

Some closed-beds were built one above the other in a double-decker, two-story arrangement. In this case, young people would sleep above.

It was the main furniture of rural houses in Brittany until the 20th century. Often carved and decorated, it was the pride of its owners.

Closed-beds were 1.60 to 1.70 m length, long enough for people of that region who were rather small. And because they slept in an almost sitting position, they leaned on three or four pillows. It was the tradition of the Middle Ages not to sleep lying down, because that is the position of the dead and of effigies.

Later out of fashion and because they were expensive to make, box-beds were gradually abandoned in the 19th and 20th centuries. Fine pieces were put in museums (Lampaul-Guimiliau, Nantes, Quimper, Rennes, St-Brieuc), while most of them were converted into bookshelves, dressers or TV cabinets. In the 21st century, rental companies offer nights in authentic box-beds. The contemporary Breton designers Erwan and Ronan Bouroullec have reinterpreted the form with their lit-clos, 2000 for Galerie kreo.

Box-beds were also used to protect people of the home from the animals (pigs, hens) also living in the house,. In Breton culture, the box-bed was also believed to offer protection against wolves.

The closet-bed in the Netherlands 

In the Netherlands the closet-bed, or bedstede, was in common use into the 19th century, particularly in farmhouses in the countryside.  Closet-beds were closed off with a door or a curtain.

One of the advantages of the closet-bed was that it could be built into the living room and closed off during the day, making a separate bedroom unnecessary.  The other main advantage was that, during the winter, the small area of the closet-bed would be warmed by body heat. This meant the stove would not need to be kept stoked at night. The door would not be shut completely, but left open a bit.

During the 16th and 17th century, closet-beds were much smaller. Lying down was associated with death, and therefore sleeping was done in a half-upright position. These closet-beds held two people, and beneath them were often drawers "rolkoetsen" that pulled out and provided beds for the children.

References

Beds
History of Brittany
Social history of the Netherlands
Furniture